Kate Schellenbach (born January 5, 1966) is an American musician and television producer. She is the drummer of Luscious Jackson and was a founding drummer of the Beastie Boys.

Born in New York City, she played with the Beastie Boys from 1981 to 1984, and drummed for Luscious Jackson until the band broke up in spring of 2000, and again when they re-formed in 2011.

Schellenbach was also the drummer for the punk band the Lunachicks, during early 1993 for a very short period of time, before Chip English was recruited.

She was later an Emmy Award-winning segment producer on The Ellen DeGeneres Show appearing on screen on a show first aired on December 4, 2007, playing the bongos with host Ellen DeGeneres. She has also worked as a producer on Lopez Tonight, Kathy, Love You, Mean It with Whitney Cummings, Chelsea Lately, Hello Ross, and currently The Late Late Show with James Corden.

Personal life
Schellenbach attended New York City's math and science high school, Stuyvesant High School.  She graduated with a BA in Studio Art from Hunter College. She was romantically linked to the Breeders bassist, Josephine Wiggs. During their relationship, they were featured in an article in The Advocate, a national LGBT magazine published in the United States. They formed the short-lived band Ladies Who Lunch, and Schellenbach played drums on Luscious Jackson's side-project, Kostars, which Wiggs recorded and co-produced.

References

External links

1966 births
Living people
People from Manhattan
Stuyvesant High School alumni
American lesbian musicians
LGBT people from New York (state)
Luscious Jackson members
American people of German descent
American rock drummers
Beastie Boys members
American women drummers
Feminist musicians
Television producers from New York City
American women television producers
Musicians from New York City
20th-century American drummers
20th-century American women musicians
20th-century American LGBT people
21st-century American LGBT people